WPNH-FM (100.1 MHz) is a commercial radio station located in Plymouth, New Hampshire. The station identifies itself as "100.1 The Planet" and airs active rock peppered with alternative rock and, more recently, classic rock. The station primarily covers the western Lakes Region and southern White Mountains area, though it can be heard as far south as Manchester and as far west as Barre, Vermont.

WPNH-FM originally transmitted from a hilltop in nearby Holderness until the late 1990s when the station's transmitter was moved to the top of Tenney Mountain in Plymouth by new owners.

In January 2013, soon after another rock station in the area was purchased by new owners who immediately stopped broadcasting the show, WPNH-FM became the Central New Hampshire affiliate for The Free Beer and Hot Wings Show. It replaced the station's previous morning show, the locally-produced "Daily Planet" hosted by then-music director Annie Biello and newswoman Amy Bates.

On December 29, 2014, shortly after hiring a new music director, the station began incorporating classic rock into its programming while eliminating most of its classic alternative catalog. The station now primarily broadcasts Westwood One's Rock 2.0 music service, peppering in locally-selected music on featured shows like Local Outbreak, Out Of The Box and Punch Out.

WPNH-FM's sister stations are WFTN and WFTN-FM in Franklin, WSCY in Moultonborough, and WPNH in Plymouth.

The station does not stream its signal over the internet.

References

External links
Official website

PNH-FM
Active rock radio stations in the United States
Radio stations established in 1975
1975 establishments in New Hampshire
Plymouth, New Hampshire